Samuel Miller may refer to:
Samuel Miller (theologian) (1769–1850), professor at Princeton Theological Seminary and author of The Ruling Elder (1831)
Samuel Miller (musician), American trumpeter
Samuel F. Miller (U.S. politician) (1827–1892), United States Representative from New York
Samuel Freeman Miller (1816–1890), associate justice of the United States Supreme Court
Justice Samuel Freeman Miller House, listed on the National Register of Historic Places in Iowa
Samuel Henry Miller (1840–1918), U.S. Representative from Pennsylvania
Samuel Stephens Miller, member of the Wisconsin State Assembly
Samuel Miller, 19th century Virginian benefactor of The Miller School of Albemarle
Samuel Augustine Miller (1819–1890), Confederate congressman
Sammy Miller (born 1933), motorcycle racer from Northern Ireland
Sammy Miller (rugby league), English rugby league footballer who played in the 1920s, 1930s and 1940s
Sammy Miller (engineer), dragster and funny car builder in the 1970s and 1980s
Samuel Miller (saw), one claimant to have invented the circular saw in 1777
Samuel Miller (USMC) (1775–1855), officer in the United States Marine Corps

See also
Sam Miller (disambiguation)
Samuel Christy-Miller (1810–1889), English businessman and politician